The Bundesstraße 2R is a German federal highway (German: Bundesstraße) in Bavaria. It is called the "Middle Ring" (German: Mittlerer Ring) because of its concentric position between the Altstadtring and the incomplete Outer Ring, as well as being within the Autobahnring.

Traffic importance
The Middle Ring is the backbone of all traffic in Munich, since the ring is the fastest connection to all major traffic axes in the city. It replaced all the Bundesstraßen that ran through the center of the city, even the Bundesstraße 2, for which it is named (the R stands for Ring). Within the Middle Ring, there are only municipal streets.

From the eight Autobahns that go to Munich, six of them have access to the Middle Ring. The A 8 (towards Salzburg), A 9 (towards Nuremberg-Berlin) and A 96 (towards Lindau) all have direct access to the Middle Ring. The A 94 is connected to the Ring via a short section of the Einsteinstraße, but an exit from the A 94 goes directly into the northbound Richard-Strauss-Tunnel on the Middle Ring. The A 95 is connected to the Middle Ring by the B 2, and the A 995 is connected via the B 13. However, both Bundesstraßen are built to Autobahn standards and signed as such. Only the A 8 towards Stuttgart has a longer connection to the Middle Ring, a 7 km-long section of the  Verdistraße and Arnulfstraße. The A 92 ends at the Autobahnring, but is connected to the Middle Ring via the A 9.

The E54 runs along the southwest section of the Middle Ring between the A 96 and the A 995. This section of the route is also particularly affected by long-distance traffic, because neither the motorway ring of the A 99 in the south-west of Munich is closed nor the originally planned Outer Ring has been realized here, meaning the long-distance traffic has to go into the city.

References

002R